Parcheh Sorkheh (also known as Pacheh Sorkheh and Pachī Shorkheh) is a village in Zirtang Rural District, Kunani District, Kuhdasht County, Lorestan Province, Iran. At the 2006 census, its population was 88, in 15 families.

References 

Towns and villages in Kuhdasht County